Łowiczans, also known as the Łowicz Dukes, is an ethnographic group of Polish people, that are part of the ethnographic subgroup of Masovians. They originate from the north west Masovia, located within borders of the Masovian Voivodeship, Poland. The group speak in the Łowicz subdialect of the Masovian dialect of Polish.

History 
The group originates from the north west Masovia, located within borders of the Masovian Voivodeship, Poland. Historically, that area was part of the region known as the Duchy of Łowicz, a private estate of the Roman Catholic Archdiocese of Gniezno. The group had enjoyed more freedoms than the neighboring people, and as such, which contributed to them developing a separate identity. They also were freed from the Serfdom much earlier than other groups in the region, further building their cultural identity separate from the other groups.

Notes

References 

Lowiczans
Lowiczans
Lowiczans
Lowiczans
Lowiczans
Lowiczans
Lowiczans